Hurt Wood Mill is a grade II* listed tower mill at Ewhurst, Surrey, England which has been converted to residential use.

History

Hurt Wood Mill was built in 1845, replacing a post mill that had been blown down. The post mill was standing in 1648. The mill worked by wind until c1885 and the  sails and fantail were removed shortly afterwards. The mill house was converted at some point, with two new sails being fitted in 1914. In 1937 four new sails and two new stocks were fitted by Neve's, the Heathfield millwrights.

Description

Hurt Wood Mill is a four storey brick tower mill with an ogee cap. It had four Patent sails carried on a cast iron windshaft. The cap was winded by a fantail. The clasp arm Brake Wheel is wooden. When the mill was a working mill, it had sails that rotated anticlockwise, but those fitted in 1937 would have rotated clockwise had they been a working set.

Millers

Richard Evelyn - 1648 (post mill)
George Hard and Daniel Randell 1705
John Twist 1718
Edward Bennet 1730s
William Bray and William Lassam 1748
Jacob Lassam
Mary White 1843
David Lassam 1845 (tower mill)
H Joyes 1855

References for above:-

Culture and media

Hurt Wood Mill appears on the crest of a hill in the painting "Harvest Time" by George Vicat Cole (1833–1893), which is now in Bristol City Museum and Art Gallery. It also appeared in an episode of The Tomorrow People titled The Doomsday Men.

George Harrison wrote Here Comes the Sun with Eric Clapton at this windmill in 1969 while avoiding a meeting with the Beatles' record company, Apple Records.

External links
Windmill World webpage on Hurt Wood mill.

References

Tower mills in the United Kingdom
Grinding mills in the United Kingdom
Windmills completed in 1845
Grade II listed buildings in Surrey
Windmills in Surrey
Grade II listed windmills